The 2013–14 season was the Persepolis's 13th season in the Pro League, and their 31st consecutive season in the top division of Iranian Football. They were also be competing in the Hazfi Cup but were eliminated by Foolad in Quarter-finals. Persepolis is captained by Mohammad Nouri.

Key events
 20 May: Ali Daei was officially announced as the club's manager for the season. He joined the club with a three-year contract.
 25 May: Former Saipa's winger, Milad Gharibi signed two-years contract as the season's first signing.
 26 May: Daei introduces Javad Manafi, Behzad Gholampour, Reza Forouzani, Mohammadreza Molaei, Mohammad Daei and Karim Bagheri as his assistants. Also Mehrdad Kafshgari and Mohammad Abbaszadeh joined The Reds. Both of them signed three-years contracts. Abbaszadeh became 2012–13 Azadegan League top scorer with 18 goals in 23 match while Kafshgari spent previous season at Rah Ahan Sorinet.
 27 May: Alireza Nourmohammadi extending for another one-years and Hadi Norouzi & Mohammad Nouri extending for another two-years.
 29 May: After rumors around signing of Mehdi Rahmati and Rahman Ahmadi, Persepolis extends with Brazilian goalkeeper Nilson Corrêa for another year.
 1 June: Farshad Ahmadzadeh was loaned to Tractor Sazi to spend conscription period till December 2014.
 3 June: The Club officially announced that Reza Haghighi will part of team for 2013–14 season. That mean Persepolis rejected bids from Dynamo Kyiv and Brøndby IF for the player. Also Mehrdad Pouladi extends until 2014 and Meysam Hosseini signed two-years contract.
 9 June: Payam Sadeghian & The Club finally reached to an agreement for two seasons. former Iran national under-17 football team captain will join The Reds as 28 June.
 11 June: Former Tractor Sazi striker, Mehdi Seyed Salehi officially joined The Reds with a two-year contract. Omid Alishah also signed two-years contract. Both of them will join training camp as 13 June.
 3 July: Former Tractor Sazi defensive midfielder, Ghasem Dehnavi officially joined The Reds with a one-year contract.
 4 July: Marko Šćepanović came to Iran on 1 July 2013 and also trained with the team for three days and participated in a friendly match with Persepolis shirt. Finally Marko Šćepanović officially joined The Reds with a one-year contract on 4 July. He scored 14 goals in 28 matches in Montenegrin First League 2012–13. He is a former Podgoricai player.
 18 July: Alireza Haghighi returned to Persepolis on loan from Rubin Kazan and signed a contract for half a season with the club.
 1 September: Sepahan's winger, Mohammad Reza Khalatbari signed two-years contract with a record fee. He was given the number 99 shirt.
 15 September: Afshin Esmaeilzadeh was loaned to Beira-Mar till 30 June 2014.
 18 November: Mohammadreza Khanzadeh was loaned to Zob Ahan till 10 May 2014.
 18 November: Mohsen Mosalman joined to Persepolis on loan from Zob Ahan till 10 May 2014.
 26 November: Younes Shakeri was loaned to Padideh till 31 March 2014.
 27 November: Hadi Norouzi was loaned to Naft Tehran till 10 May 2014.

Squad

First team squad

Iran Pro League squad
Updated 3 December 2013.

 

 

 U21 = Under 21 Player
 U23 = Under 23 Player

Loan list

 

For recent transfers, see List of Iranian football transfers summer 2013 & List of Iranian football transfers winter 2013–14. 
For more on the reserve and academy squads, see Persepolis Novin, Persepolis Academy, Persepolis Shomal & Persepolis Qaem Shahr.

Transfers

In

Out

Competition record

Iran Pro League

Standings

Competitions

Overview

Results summary

Results by round

Matches

Hazfi Cup

Friendly Matches

Pre-season

During season

Statistics

Appearances, goals and disciplinary record

Updated as of 11 April 2014

1 Player left the club during the season.
2 Player joined the club during the season.
3 Includes four own goals (by Farzad Hatami against Foolad, by Amin Motevaselzadeh against Damash, by Majid Noormohammadi against Padideh & Mohammad Heidari against Fajr Sepasi).
4 Red card in match against Sepahan (fixture X) was switched to yellow card by FFIRI disciplinarian committee.

Man of the Match & Man of Ethics

Injuries During The season 
Players in bold are still out from their injuries.

Overall statistics

Updated as of 11 April 2014 
Source: Competitions

Club

Kit 

|
|
|

Official sponsors
•  Uhlsport
•  Sadra System Pasargad 
•  Tourism Bank
Source: Persepolis F.C. official website

Captains
Updated on 11 April 2014

Coaching staff

Other personnel

Club committees 

{| class="wikitable" "align: right;"
|-
! Munition Team
|-
| Ghasem Abdolsamadi
|-
| Asghar Norouzali

Grounds

See also
 2013–14 Persian Gulf Cup
 2013–14 Hazfi Cup

References

External links
Iran Premier League Statistics
Persian League
Persepolis News

Persepolis F.C. seasons
Persepolis